Hans-Rudolf Boehmer was Inspector of the Navy from 1995 to 1998.

References

External links 

Vice admirals of the German Navy
1938 births
Living people
Chiefs of Navy (Germany)